Hugo Omar Villanueva Clavería (born 9 April 1939) is a Chilean former football defender.

Career
Villanueva played for Chile in the 1966 FIFA World Cup. 

At club level, he played for Club Universidad de Chile and for Universidad de El Salvador.

References

External links

FIFA profile
Hugo Villanueva at PartidosdeLaRoja.com 

1939 births
Living people
Chilean footballers
Chilean expatriate footballers
Chile international footballers
Association football defenders
Universidad de Chile footballers
Chilean Primera División players
Salvadoran Primera División players
Chilean expatriate sportspeople in El Salvador
Expatriate footballers in El Salvador
1966 FIFA World Cup players
20th-century Chilean people
21st-century Chilean people